Khalifehlu (also Romanized as Khalīfehlū and Khalifehloo; also known as Khalaf ‘Alī and Khalaflū) is a village in Dikleh Rural District, Hurand District, Ahar County, East Azerbaijan Province, Iran. At the 2006 census, its population was 105, in 20 families.

References 

Populated places in Ahar County